Clement Meadmore (9 February 1929 – 19 April 2005) was an Australian-American sculptor known for massive outdoor steel sculptures.

Biography
Born Clement Lyon Meadmore in Melbourne, Australia in 1929, Clement Meadmore studied aeronautical engineering and then industrial design at the Royal Melbourne Institute of Technology. After graduating in 1949, Meadmore designed furniture for several years and, in the 1950s, created his first welded sculptures. He had several one-man exhibits of his sculptures in Melbourne and Sydney between 1954 and 1962. In 1963, Meadmore moved to New York City. Later, he became an American citizen.

Meadmore used COR-TEN steel, aluminum, and occasionally bronze to create colossal outdoor sculptures which combine the elements of abstract expressionism and minimalism. He was an avid amateur drummer and jazz lover who held jam sessions in his home. His fondness for jazz is reflected in the names of several of his works, including "Riff" (1996), "Round Midnight" (1996), "Stormy Weather" (1997), "Night and Day" (1979) and "Perdido" (1978).

Meadmore's sculptures are held by museums, corporate headquarters, and schools internationally. His work has been exhibited in a number of galleries, including the Anita Shapolsky Gallery in New York City, the Columbus Gallery of Fine Art in Ohio, and the Davenport Municipal Art Gallery in Iowa.

He authored How to Make Furniture Without Tools (1975) and The Modern Chair: Classic Designs by Thonet, Breuer, Le Corbusier, Eames and Others (1997). His work and career were catalogued in The Sculpture of Clement Meadmore (1994) by Eric Gibson.

Death
Meadmore died at age 76 in Manhattan from complications of Parkinson's disease.

Publications

Books by Meadmore
How to Make Furniture Without Tools (Pantheon, 1975)
The Modern Chair: Classic Designs by Thonet, Breuer, Le Corbusier, Eames and Others (Dover, 1997)

Books about Meadmore
The Sculpture of Clement Meadmore by Eric Gibson (Hudson Hills, 1994)

Sculptures in public collections and public spaces

Australia 
Australian Capital Territory
 Virginia, 1970, National Gallery of Australia, Canberra
 Victoria
 Awakening, 1968, AMP Society, Melbourne
 Dervish, 1981, Victorian Arts Centre, Melbourne
 Paraphernalia, 1999, McClelland Gallery and Sculpture Park, Langwarrin, Melbourne
 New South Wales
 Silence, 1960, Art Gallery of New South Wales, Sydney
 Thunder, 1960, Art Gallery of New South Wales, Sydney
 Double Up, 1970, Art Gallery of New South Wales, Sydney
 Flippant Flurry, 1977, Art Gallery of New South Wales, Sydney
 Hereabout, 1971/2001, Newcastle Art Gallery, Newcastle
 Western Australia
 Between 1979–1980, 1981, Perth Cultural Centre, Perth
 Queensland
 Offshoot, 1982, Queensland Government, Brisbane

United States 
California
 Bent, 1966, Newport Harbor Art Museum, Newport Beach
 Up Ended, 1969, University of California Art Museum, Santa Barbara
District of Columbia
 Riding High, 1977, Gallaudet College, Washington
Florida
 Trans, 1972, Performance Asset Management, West Palm Beach
Northbridge Center, West Palm Beach
Illinois
 Spiral, 1971, Nathan Manilow Sculpture Park, University Park
Iowa
Sophisticated Lady, 1977, Figge Art Museum, Davenport
Kentucky
 Fling, 1971, Speed Art Museum, Louisville
Kansas
 Always, 1992, Johnson County Community College, Overland Park
Louisiana
 Out of There, 1974, Hale Boggs Federal Building Plaza, New Orleans
 Flippant Flurry, 1977, Mrs. P. Roussel Norman, New Orleans
Massachusetts
 Upsurge, 1989, Diana Chapman Walsh Alumnae Hall, Wellesley College, Wellesley
Michigan
 Hob Nob, 1992, University of Michigan, North Campus, Ann Arbor
 Upcast, 1985, Southfield Rd & Maple Rd, Birmingham
 Virginia, 1970, Detroit Institute of Arts, Detroit
 Split Ring, 1969, Woodland Mall, Grand Rapids
 However, 1998, Dennos Museum Center, Traverse City
New Hampshire
Dervish, 1972, Currier Museum of Art, Manchester
Perdido, 1978, Dartmouth College, Hanover
New Jersey
 Offshoot, 1982, Grounds for Sculpture, Hamilton
 Upstart 2, 1973, Entrance to the Engineering Quadrangle, Princeton University, Princeton
New York
 Verge, 1970, Governor Nelson A. Rockefeller Empire State Plaza Art Collection, Albany
 Turn Out, 1967, Governor Nelson A. Rockefeller Empire State Plaza Art Collection, Albany
 Wingspread, 1999, 400 Chambers Street, Manhattan
 Curl, 1968, Columbia University, New York
 Swing, 1969, Chase Manhattan Bank, New York
 Wave, 1969, Chase Manhattan Bank, New York
 Three Up, 1977, White Plains Courthouse, White Plains
 Untitled, 1971, Sarah Lawrence College, Bronxville
Ohio
 Open End, 1984, St. Xavier High School, Cincinnati
 Branching Out, 1981, Cleveland Museum of Art, Cleveland
 Out of There, 1974, Columbus Museum of Art, Columbus
 Extent, 1981, Pyramid Sculpture Park, Hamilton
 Clench, 1979, 34555 Chagrin Boulevard, Moreland Hills
 Switchback, 1980, 811 Madison, Toledo
 Upbeat, 1984, Butler Institute of American Art, Youngstown
Oregon
 Split Ring, 1969, Portland Art Museum, Portland
Pennsylvania
 Up and Away, 1977, PNC Plaza, Pittsburgh
 Hence, 1977, Hartwood Acres Park, Pittsburgh
 Cross Current, 1980, Smith Kline Corporation, Philadelphia
Texas
 Upbeat, 1984, the Colonnade, Dallas
 Split Level, 1971, University of Houston, Houston
Vermont
 Around and About, 1971, Middlebury College, Middlebury
Virginia
Lake Fairfax Business Center, Reston
Wisconsin
Double Up, 1970, Lynden Sculpture Garden, Milwaukee
Upstart I, 1967, Lynden Sculpture Garden, Milwaukee

International 
Canada
 Upstart II, 1970, Robert McLaughlin Gallery, Oshawa, Ontario
Japan
 Crescendo, 1989, Tokyo Metropolitan Theatre, Tokyo, Japan
Mexico
 Janus, 1968, Ruta de la Amistad, Mexico City, Mexico
Taiwan
 Portal, 1995, Kaohsiung Museum of Fine Arts, Kaohsiung City, Taiwan

References

External links

Clement Meadmore official website

1929 births
2005 deaths
RMIT University alumni
20th-century Australian sculptors
Artists from Melbourne
Australian emigrants to the United States
20th-century American sculptors
20th-century American male artists
American male sculptors
Deaths from Parkinson's disease
Neurological disease deaths in New York (state)